The Distribution of Industry Act 1950 was an Act of Parliament passed in the United Kingdom by the Labour government of Clement Attlee. It strengthened the powers of the Board of Trade in the Development Areas, making “further provision for the acquisition of land, creation of easements and carrying out of work in development areas.” It also authorized “the Board of Trade “to make grants, in exceptional cases in connection with the establishment in, or transfer to, development areas of industrial undertakings, and to make grants or loans to housing associations for the provision of dwellings in development areas.” In addition, the Act also provided for payments towards the cost of removal and resettlement of key workers and their dependants.

Notes

United Kingdom Acts of Parliament 1950